Yamazaki or Yamasaki (written:  lit. "mountain promontory") is the 22nd most common Japanese surname. Notable people with the surname include:

Amy Yamazaki, British actress
Arturo Yamasaki, Peruvian-Mexican football referee
, Japanese philosopher and scholar
, Japanese voice actress
, Japanese voice actress
, Japanese voice actress and singer
, Japanese kickboxer
, Japanese rhythmic gymnast
, Japanese actress
, Japanese comedian
, Japanese photographer
, Japanese weightlifter
, Japanese field hockey player
, Japanese poet
, better known as Hōsei Tsukitei, Japanese comedian and rakugo performer
, Japanese manga artist
, Japanese actor and singer
, Japanese professional wrestler
, Japanese lawyer, politician and cabinet minister
, Japanese television personality
, Japanese diplomat
, Japanese footballer
, Japanese baseball player
, Japanese hurdler
, Japanese professional wrestler and commentator
, Japanese general
, Japanese sprinter
, Japanese footballer
, Japanese actor
, Japanese manga artist
, Japanese general
, Japanese footballer
, Japanese footballer
Kunio Yamazaki, Japanese biologist
, Japanese archer
Lindsey Yamasaki (born 1980), American women's basketball player
, Japanese footballer and manager
, Japanese gravure idol and actress
, Japanese manga artist
Mario Yamasaki, Brazilian mixed martial arts referee
, Japanese women's footballer
, Japanese politician
, Japanese cross-country skier
, Japanese writer, literary critic and philosopher
, Japanese footballer
, Japanese footballer
, Japanese musician
, Japanese musician
, Japanese politician
, singer and member of the j-pop girl group Morning Musume
, Japanese-American architect
, Japanese archaeologist
Naka Yamazaki, better known as Sophia Wilson, Japanese courtesan
, Japanese writer
, Japanese astronaut
, Japanese geographer
, Japanese footballer
, Japanese gymnast
, Japanese freestyle skier
, Japanese video game composer
, Japanese bobsledder
, Japanese swimmer
Shigueto Yamasaki (born 1966), Brazilian judoka
, Japanese water polo player
, Japanese inventor
, Japanese poet
, Shinsengumi officer and spy
, Japanese film director, screenwriter and visual effects director
, Japanese voice actor
, Japanese shogi player
, Japanese politician
, Japanese karateka and kickboxer
Tizuka Yamasaki (born 1949), Brazilian film director
, Japanese ice hockey player
, Japanese sport wrestler
, Japanese artist
, Japanese actor
, Japanese voice actress
, Japanese baseball player
Yasutsugu Yamasaki, Japanese engineer designer of the Akashi Bridge
, Imperial Japanese Army officer
, Japanese announcer
, Japanese racewalker
, Japanese footballer

Fictional characters
Asami Yamazaki, from the Audition horror film
Kaoru Yamazaki, from Welcome to the N.H.K.
Linna Yamazaki, from the anime series Bubblegum Crisis
Ryuji Yamazaki, a SNK character
Takashi Yamazaki, from Cardcaptor Sakura anime
Tanpopo Yamazaki, from the manga series Imadoki!
Sagaru Yamazaki, from the manga series Gintama
Sosuke Yamazaki, from the anime series Free! - Eternal Summer

References

Japanese-language surnames